Senderos de traición is the second studio album by the Spanish rock band Héroes del Silencio, released the December 4 1990. The album was especially successful in Spain and Germany. In August 1993, 750,000 copies had been sold worldwide, half of which were sales in Spain.

Track listing

Chart performance

Personnel 
 Enrique Bunbury - vocalist
 Joaquin Cardiel - bass
 Juan Valdivia - guitar
 Pedro Andreu - drums

References 
Citations

General references

External links 
 

Héroes del Silencio albums
1990 albums
Albums produced by Phil Manzanera
EMI Records albums
Spanish-language albums